Gert Elsässer (born 1949) is an Austrian skeleton racer who competed in the early 1980s. He won the gold medal in the men's event at the first skeleton World Championships in 1982 in St. Moritz. He was European champion in 1981 and 1982 and came in second in 1983. Elsässer was born in Innsbruck.

References
Gert Elsasser at Skeletonsport.com
Austrian bobsleigh and skeleton history 
FIBT men's skeleton results: 1928-2005 (link invalid as of December 6, 2007).

1949 births
Living people
Austrian male skeleton racers
Sportspeople from Innsbruck